Baishui (白水镇, meaning white water) is a town in Jishui County, Ji'an Municipality, Jiangxi.

History
Before Liberation, the town was known as Baishui Township.

In 1951 part of its territory was used to form the new township of Dongying (东营, meaning east camp). Seven years later, as the 2nd 5-year plan (AKA Great Leap Forward) got underway, the two territories were recombined as Dongying.

Baishui was created as a People's commune in 1972, by the addition to Dongying Commune of two production brigades—Hengchuan and Chanxi—originally in Qiubei Commune.

Though differing from its pre-Liberation form in these additions, Baishui was made back into a township in 1984. It has been a town since 1993.

Administration
The town executive, CPC sub-branch and PSB sub-station (派出所, paichusuo) are in Baishui Neighbourhood (居委会, juweihui).

The town also runs 8 village committees : 
 Xiache 
 Shangdongying 
 Hongqiao 
 Zhouxi 
 Xiadongying 
 Tuling (土岭) 
 Chanxi 
 Hengchuan

Produce
 Grains, Chinese chestnuts, shaddocks, tangerines, tea.

Notes and references

Cities in Jiangxi